cis-Cyclooctene is a cycloalkene with the formula (CH2)6(CH)2. It is a colorless liquid that is used industrially to produce a polymer.  It is also a ligand in organometallic chemistry.

Cyclooctene is the smallest cycloalkene that can be isolated as both the cis- and trans-isomer. cis-Cyclooctene is shaped like the 8-carbon equivalent chair conformation of cyclohexane.

Uses and reactions
Cyclooctene undergoes ring-opening metathesis polymerization to give polyoctenamers, which are marketed under the name Vestenamer.

cis-Cyclooctene (COE) is a substrate known for quite selectively forming the epoxide, as compared to other cycloalkenes, e.g. cyclohexene. Low amounts of radical by-products are found only. This behaviour is attributed to the difficulty of functionalizing allylic  CH centers, which almost orthogonal allylic C-H bonds. Therefore, if radicals are around, they tend to form epoxide via an addition-elimination mechanism.

It is used as an easily displaced ligand in organometallic chemistry, e.g. chlorobis(cyclooctene)rhodium dimer and chlorobis(cyclooctene)iridium dimer.

References

Cycloalkenes